The Metropolitan School District of Warren County administers the one high school/middle school and three elementary schools in Warren County, Indiana.  Its offices are located in the county seat of Williamsport.  During the 2009–10 school year, it served 1,257 students.

History
After winning approval in the fall 1972 election, the MSD of Warren County was formed in January 1973 through the merger of two other school districts.  These were Warren Central Consolidation (Superintendent Bob Johnson) which included the schools at West Lebanon, Marshfield, State Line, Judyville and Kramer, and Warren Community Schools (Superintendent Willis Horn) which administered schools at Pine Village and Williamsport.  John R. Johnson, Seeger High School principal, became superintendent of the new consolidated district.  Its offices were established in the former REMC building at 101 North Monroe Street.  Superintendent Bob Johnson retired in 1987 and was replaced by Dr. Roy L Stroud, Assistant Superintendent.  The 1988 Williamsport fire damaged the building to such an extent that it had to be demolished.  The district's current offices were constructed on the site in 1989.  Dr. Stroud served as superintendent for 14 years and was replaced by Terry Roderick when he retired as superintendent in 2001.  Stroud continued to serve several years as the Lilly Grant administrator.  Superintendent Stroud and Tom Polf (History teacher, guidance counselor, and coach) were the last two employees to retire from MSD who were there when the consolidation occurred in 1972.  Both had served 42 years each.

Schools
 Seeger Memorial Junior-Senior High School 
 Pine Village Elementary School 
 Warren Central Elementary School 
 Williamsport Elementary School

References

External links
 MSD of Warren County website

Warren County
Education in Warren County, Indiana
School districts established in 1973
1973 establishments in Indiana